The Römpp Encyclopedia Natural Products is an encyclopedia of natural products written by German chemists who specialize in this area of science. It is published by Thieme Medical Publishers.

See also 

 Römpp's Chemistry Lexicon

References

Further reading

External links 
 

German encyclopedias
Natural products
Encyclopedias of science